Tursun may refer to
Tusrun (name)
Tursun Uljaboev, a municipality in Tajikistan
Tursun Tuychiev, a municipality in Tajikistan